The Strange Land is a 1954 thriller novel by the British writer Hammond Innes. It was released in the United States by Knopf under the alternative title The Naked Land.

It is set in the far south of French Morocco, where a mission station is awaiting the arrival of a new Czech Doctor.

References

Bibliography
 James Vinson & D. L. Kirkpatrick. Contemporary Novelists. St. James Press, 1986.

1954 British novels
Novels by Hammond Innes
British thriller novels
Novels set in Morocco
William Collins, Sons books